Kanadukathan is a Town Panchayat in the Karaikudi taluk of the Indian state of Tamil Nadu.

Demographics

In 2001, Kanadukathan had a population of 4,795 people. Of these, 10% were under 6 years of age. The town is evenly split between males and females. Kanadukathan has a literacy rate of 74%, higher than the national average of 63.4%. According to the Indian census, the male literacy rate is 80% and the female literacy rate is 67%.

Specialities
Kanadukathan is most famous for its Chettinad cuisine and for the architecture of its houses, whose main entrances are shaped to resemble those of temples.

Events
 Festival of the Goddess of Beauty (Tamil: பொன்னழகி அம்மன் திருவிழா) is a 10-day festival held in May every year.
 Hari Poojai is held in May every year.
 Sivarathiri is held in March. During Shivaratri, people take kavadi from Pazhaiyur (old Kanadukathan) to the Solai Andavar Temple (approximately 4 km).
 festival of the nagamuthu mariamman temple chiththira full moon day function is a 10 days 
festival held in April–May every year

Schools / Colleges
  M.ct.M.Chidambaram Chettiyar Higher Secondary School [ISO 9001 Certified]
  M.ct.M.Chidambaram Chettiyar Elementary School
  CV.CT.V.Meenakshi Achi Matriculation School
  Annamalai Polytechnic College

Places of interest
 Pillayarpatti Kovil—religious site 1,600 years old Hindu Temple (16 km)
 Kundrakudi Murugan Kovil—religious site (Hill Temple), Hindu Temple (14 km)
 Thirumayam Fort — historical site (10 km)
 Chettinad Palace — It was designed by Dr Annamalai Chettiyar with European influence in its architecture.
 Island Bungalow — heritage site (2 km)
 CVCT CVRM House - Unique Historical Chettinad Twin Houses

Connection with major cities
 By road: located on Trichy – Rameshwaram National Highway [NH-210]. 
 14 km from Karaikudi
 32 km from Pudukkottai
 82 km from Trichy
 90 km from Madurai
 159 km from Rameshwaram
 287 km from Coimbatore 
 405 km from Chennai

 By train: Chettinad station is located on the Trichy – Rameswhwaram line. The following expresses stop at this station.

 The Chennai – Rameshwaram express (16701) 
 Rameshwaram – Chennai express (16702) 
 Trichy- Rameshwaram, Trichy-Karaikudi, Trichy-Manamadurai and Manamadurai-Mannargudi Passenger Trains

Requests have been made to operate a daily overnight train between Coimbatore and Rameswaram via Kanadukathan (CTND).

References

Cities and towns in Sivaganga district